Leicestershire County Council is the county council for the English non-metropolitan county of Leicestershire. It was originally formed in 1889 by the Local Government Act 1888. The county is divided into 52 electoral divisions, which return a total of 55 councillors. The council is controlled by the Conservative Party. The leader of the county council is currently Nick Rushton, who was elected to the post in September 2012.  The headquarters of the council is County Hall beside the A50 at Glenfield, just outside the city of Leicester in Blaby district.

History 
From its establishment in 1889 to 1974, the county council covered the administrative county of Leicestershire, excluding Leicester. In 1974, the Local Government Act reconstituted Leicestershire County Council, adding the former county borough of Leicester, and the small county of Rutland to the area. On 1 April 1997 these were removed from the county council area again, to become unitary authorities.

Districts and boroughs
Leicestershire has three tiers of local government. These tiers are the county council, seven district or borough councils and parish councils all of which charge a mandatory tax in return for a service. In urban areas the work of the parish council is likely to be undertaken by the county or district council. The seven district councils in Leicestershire are:
 Blaby District Council
 Charnwood Borough Council
 Harborough District Council
 Hinckley & Bosworth Borough Council
 Melton Borough Council
 North West Leicestershire District Council
 Oadby & Wigston Borough Council
These district councils are responsible for local planning and building control, local roads, council housing, environmental health, markets and fairs, refuse collection and recycling, cemeteries and crematoria, leisure services, parks, and tourism

Political control 

Leicestershire County Council consists of 55 elected members, from 52 wards. The most recent election was the May 2017 elections, where all seats were up for re-election. Following these elections the current political composition of the council is as follows.

Elections were held for the reconstituted county council (including Leicester and Rutland) in 1973, leading to no overall control. 1977 saw the Conservative Party take control, but they lost it again in 1981. Elections in 1985, 1989, 1993 and 1997 continued No Overall Control. The Conservatives took control in 2001, helped in part by the removal of the strongly Labour-voting Leicester from the county.

The council's cabinet has, as of May 2021, the following members, with the following portfolios:
 Nick Rushton – Leadership of the Council locally, regionally and nationally. Growth & Infrastructure.
Deborah Taylor – Deputy Leader. Children and Family Services (the designated lead member for children and young people), Community Safety and Safeguarding, Regulatory Services, County Council representative on Police and Crime Panel.
Peter Bedford - Post-Covid Recovery and Ways of Working. (The portfolio includes responsibilities for Transformation previously within the Resources portfolio).
Lee Breckon - Resources i.e. Functions of the Corporate Resources Department: finance, property, ICT and human resources, and the operational aspects of those functions. 
Ozzy O'Shea – Highways, Transportation and Flooding (This includes the flooding responsibilities of the Environment and Transport Department, and the Local Flood Risk Management Strategy).
Blake Pain - Environment and the Green Agenda. (Responsibility for waste management and disposal sits with this portfolio, as does the County planning function, the Environment Strategy and related strategies).
Pam Posnett - Community and Staff Relations (Includes Broadband).
Christine Radford - Adults and Communities
Louise Richardson - Health. Chair of the Health and Wellbeing Board.
Richard Shepherd - Support for Resources portfolio.

Departments 

There are six departments:

Corporate Resources (including property, finance, HR, communications, country parks and traded services)
Environment and Transport (including highways, transport and waste)
Adults and Communities (including adult social care, museums, libraries and adult learning)
Children and Family Services (including children's social care and school support)
Public health (which commissions a wide range of public health services, including smoking cessation, school nurses and sport and fitness programmes)
Chief Executive's (including policy, democratic services, trading standards, registration services, planning, legal services)

Key responsibilities 

In the five years to 2015, the council's roles and responsibilities changed significantly, due to austerity savings, the transfer of public health from the NHS to the council and many schools becoming academies, independent of the council.

However, that still left a number of key responsibilities. As of December 2015, these are: social care for adults and children; support for schools; highways and transport; public health; waste disposal; economic development; libraries and museums; strategic planning; trading standards; country parks; registration of births, marriages and deaths; and community leadership.

Financial situation 

The council claims to be the lowest-funded county council, yet one of the top three best performers, across a wide range of indicators.

From 2010–2015, the council has had to save £100 million – two-thirds as efficiency savings and the remainder from services. The council has predicted it will have to save more from services as austerity continues, with a further £100 million-plus of savings required over the next four years.

As of 2015/16, the council's annual budget was £348 million and it had just over 5,000 full-time equivalent staff.

Electoral divisions

Notable members
Charles Manners, 10th Duke of Rutland, was a county councillor 1945–1985 and Chairman 1974–1977.

See also
Aberglaslyn Hall
Local government in England

References

External links 

 
1889 establishments in England
County councils of England
Leader and cabinet executives
Local authorities in Leicestershire
Local education authorities in England
Major precepting authorities in England
Organisations based in Leicestershire